Al Jawf is a town in southeastern Libya, the capital of the Kufra district in Libya.

The city has an elevation of 382.2 m (1,254 feet). In a 1984 census the city's population was 17,320.  Al Jawf receives almost no rain whatsoever, averaging only 2.5mm (.1 inch) per year. Summer high temperatures average above 37.8 °C (100 °F).

The city lies in the largest oasis in the Kufra basin, extracting the water from the Nubian Sandstone Aquifer System. It is one of the most heavily irrigated oases in the Sahara. The surrounding area contains clusters of center-pivot irrigation systems used for agriculture. The distinctive pattern was photographed from orbit by the crew of the International Space Station in 2016.

Climate
Al Jawf has a hot desert climate (Köppen climate classification BWh).

Sources

References

Populated places in Kufra District
Cyrenaica